Shania Twain: Live is a TV concert special released by singer Shania Twain from her Come On Over Tour. Released on VHS and DVD, it was filmed on September 12, 1998 in Dallas, Texas, and aired live on DirecTV for free. The music video for Twain's single "Come On Over" was taken from this special. The video was certified platinum by the RIAA in 1999.

Shania Twain: Live was also released in Australia in 1999, but only on the VHS format.

Setlist

Personnel
Marc Muller - Lap Steel Guitar, Pedal Steel Guitar
Randall Waller - Guitar
Andy Cichon - Bass guitar
Brent Barcus - Guitar
Allison Cornell - Fiddle, Mandolin, Keyboards
Roddy Chiong - Fiddle, Guitar, Mandolin
Hardy Hemphill - Keyboards, Harmonica, Percussion
JD Blair - Drums
Cory Churko - Guitar, Mandolin, Fiddle
Marcus High School Drumline

Certifications and sales

References

Shania Twain video albums
1999 video albums
1999 live albums